The Halton Spartans are an American Football team based in Widnes, Cheshire, England, who compete in the BAFA National Leagues NFC 1 Central, the second level of British American Football. They are currently homeless. Formed in 2014 as the Runcorn Spartans the club were elected to the League the following year and went on to win the NFC 2 West title in 2019 earning promotion to Division 1.

History
Initially named the Runcorn Spartans, they were formed in early 2014. After contacting former members of the Halton Demons, a team that existed from the late 1980s to early 1990s, the first training sessions were organised in the local Heath Park.

The organisation changed their name to their current guise, the Halton Spartans to better represent their recruitment area. They were also more likely to play in nearby Widnes than Runcorn.

They completed their schedule of associate games, first defeating the LJMU Fury, and defeating fellow associate teams the Tynedale Fury and the Humber Warhawks in their first game at the Select Security Stadium. In December 2014, they were admitted into the BAFANL for the 2015 season and were placed in Division Two NFC West.

Ahead of the 2015 season, Double Coverage, a site that covers American Football in Britain made their annual predictions. Only one writer, Richard Penwright, predicted that the Spartans would win their division. This kick-started the "#InRichWeTrust" campaign on Twitter and Facebook. They won their first competitive game, away to the Crewe Railroaders, 24-15. The Spartans went on to complete their first season within the BAFANL with a 5-5 record. It was also noted how well managed the Spartans were for a young britball programme, most obviously for their ability to be able to draw a sizeable crowd for an amateur sport, with numbers varying from 300-600 at their peak.

The 2016 season again saw the Spartans utilise the select security stadium as their home ground. Defeating every team in their division at least once, barring the Leeds Bobcats. The Spartans were able to clinch their first winning season since joining the BAFANL the year prior. The Spartans finished a respectable 6-4, narrowly missing out on playoffs in only their second competitive season.

Before the start of the 2017 season, offence coordinator Chris Henry left the Spartans due to work commitments outside of football. Thus Halton recruited Jason Smith to take over, then head coach of Staffordshire Surge. The Spartans endured a disappointing campaign in their third season which ultimately left them with their first ever losing record finishing 4-6. Offence Coordinator Jason Smith left the Spartans midway through the season via mutual consent, with safety Doug Laughton taking the role after retiring from playing at the end of that season.

Youth Team
In the summer of 2017 the Halton Spartans announced plans to launch a youth system, looking to start two teams eligible to compete at under 17s and under 19s level. Retired linebacker Ricardo Martinez was named as Head coach of the youth system, with Samantha Whittaker taking over as Youth Team manager. The Spartans held try outs for their prospective youth system at the end of 2017 and are currently training with their group for 2018 and beyond.

Logos & Uniforms
The Spartans play in primarily green jerseys, with a white trim and black numbers. Their game pants and socks are both black, as are their helmets. Their jerseys are currently manufactured by Champro.

Their logo is a stylised Spartan helmet, similar to that of their namesakes, the Michigan State Spartans football.

Stadium

The Spartans used to play their home games at the DCBL Stadium, a 13,350 seater stadium with artificial turf. It is also home to championship rugby club, the Widnes Vikings.

Players

Current roster

Personnel

Notes

External links
Halton Spartans website

BAFA National League teams
2014 establishments in England
American football teams established in 2014
American football teams in England